Listiyanto Raharjo (2 September 1970 – 20 April 2021) was an Indonesian footballer who played as a goalkeeper.

Honours

International
Indonesia
 Southeast Asian Games silver medal: 1997

References

1970 births
2021 deaths
Indonesian footballers
Association football goalkeepers
Indonesia international footballers
Competitors at the 1997 Southeast Asian Games
Southeast Asian Games silver medalists for Indonesia
Pelita Jaya FC players
PSJS South Jakarta players
Arema F.C. players
Persib Bandung players
Persikota Tangerang players
Persibom Bolaang Mongondow players
Association football goalkeeping coaches
People from Denpasar
Sportspeople from Bali